2 Samuel 23 is the 23rd chapter in the second parts of the Books of Samuel in the Hebrew Bible (or the 23rd chapter of the "Second Book of Samuel" in the Old Testament of the Christian Bible). It contains a prophetic statement described as the "last words of David" (verses 1–7) and details of the 37 "mighty men" who were David's chief warriors (verses 8–39).

Text
The original text of this chapter was written in the Hebrew language. This chapter is divided into 39 verses.

Textual versions
Some ancient witnesses for the text of this chapter in Hebrew are of the Masoretic Text, which includes the Codex Cairensis (895), Aleppo Codex (10th century), Codex Leningradensis (1008). Fragments containing parts of this chapter in Hebrew were found among the Dead Sea Scrolls including 1Q7 (1QSam; 50 BCE) with extant verses 9–12 and 4Q51 (4QSam; 100 ‑ 50 BCE) with extant verses 1–6, 14–16, 21–22, 38–39.

There is also a translation into Koine Greek known as the Septuagint, made in the last few centuries BC. Extant ancient manuscripts of the Septuagint version include Codex Vaticanus (B; B; 4th century), Codex Sinaiticus (S; BHK: S; 4th century), and Codex Alexandrinus (A; A; 5th century).

Analysis
The Jerusalem Bible states that last words were attributed to David in the style of Jacob (see Jacob's Blessing, Genesis 49) and Moses (see Blessing of Moses, Deuteronomy 33). Its editors note that "the text has suffered considerably and reconstructions are conjectural".

 contains David's final words to Solomon, his son and successor as king.

David's last words (23:1–7)
The last words of David do not consist of a blessing (or "benediction") to Israel (unlike the blessing of Jacob in Genesis 49 or the blessing of Moses in Deuteronomy 33), but David is portrayed as a prophet speaking a prophecy (oracle) similar to Moses in Deuteronomy 32–33.

Verse 1
Now these are the last words of David.
Thus says David the son of Jesse;
Thus says the man raised up on high,
The anointed of the God of Jacob,
And the sweet psalmist of Israel:
"Anointed": "Messiah", a royal title that here refers to David, echoing 2 Samuel 22:51.
"Psalmist" (from the root word: , translated: "song"): can be rendered as "singer of songs", which refers to David; translated as the "Strong One" in NRSV which is interpreted as an epithet for Yahweh.

David's mighty men (23:8–39)

The list of David's warriors consists of several sections. The first part is about 'the Three' (the term used in LXX and Vulgate) with their names—Josheb-basshebeth, Eleazar and Shammah—and deeds (verses 8b–12, possibly until 17b). The second part is about the 'three of the thirty' (verses 13–17a) who were different from the first three, but also whose membership in the thirty is also uncertain, so probably somewhere between these two groups. The list of the Thirty starts with Asahel in verse 24, then the following warriors may be arranged geographically, with places in verses 24–35 being the closest to Bethlehem, and those in verses 36–39 were non-Israelites.

See also
David
Uriah the Hittite
Related Bible parts: 2 Samuel 11, 2 Samuel 12, 1 Chronicles 11

References

Sources

External links
 Jewish translations:
 Samuel II - II Samuel - Chapter 23 (Judaica Press). Hebrew text and English translation [with Rashi's commentary] at Chabad.org
 Christian translations:
 Online Bible at GospelHall.org (ESV, KJV, Darby, American Standard Version, Bible in Basic English)
 2 Samuel chapter 23 Bible Gateway
2 Samuel 23 English Translation with Parallel Latin Vulgate

23